Urbanice is name of several locations in the Czech Republic:

 village Urbanice (Pardubice District) in Pardubice Region
 village Urbanice (Hradec Králové District) in Hradec Králové Region

See also
Urbanice, Poland